Certification of Able Seamen Convention, 1946 is  an International Labour Organization Convention.

It was established in 1946, with the preamble stating:
Having decided upon the adoption of certain proposals with regard to the certification of able seamen,...

Ratifications
As of 2022, the convention had been ratified by 29 states. Of these ratifying states, 24 had subsequently denounced the treaty.

External links 
Text.
Ratifications.

International Labour Organization conventions
Treaties concluded in 1946
Treaties entered into force in 1951
Treaties of Algeria
Treaties of the People's Republic of Angola
Treaties of Barbados
Treaties of Belgium
Treaties of Bosnia and Herzegovina
Treaties of Egypt
Treaties of Ghana
Treaties of Guinea-Bissau
Treaties of Ireland
Treaties of Italy
Treaties of Lebanon
Treaties of Mauritius
Treaties of Montenegro
Treaties of New Zealand
Treaties of Panama
Treaties of the Estado Novo (Portugal)
Treaties of Yugoslavia
Treaties of Slovenia
Treaties of North Macedonia
Treaties of the United Kingdom
Treaties of the United States
Admiralty law treaties
Treaties extended to Guernsey
Treaties extended to Jersey
Treaties extended to the Isle of Man
Treaties extended to British Mauritius
Treaties extended to Guam
Treaties extended to Puerto Rico
Treaties extended to the United States Virgin Islands
Treaties extended to French Guiana
Treaties extended to Guadeloupe
Treaties extended to Martinique
Treaties extended to Réunion
Treaties extended to Curaçao and Dependencies
1946 in labor relations